Babushkinskaya is a Moscow Metro station in the Babushkinsky District, North-Eastern Administrative Okrug, Moscow. It was opened on September 29, 1978 as a part of the VDNKh – Medvedkovo sector. It is on the Kaluzhsko-Rizhskaya Line, between Sviblovo and Medvedkovo stations after the commissioning of which there were 107 stations in the Moscow Metro.

Name 
Babsuhkinskaya was named after Babushkinsky District where the station is located, which in turn was named after Mikhail Babushkin, a polar aviator.

On March 29, 2020 due to the coronavirus pandemic in Russia, the management of the Moscow Metro temporarily renamed the station to "DomaBabushkinskaya" (rus. Домабабушкинская) which refer to "Grandmother at home" to remind the citizen of Moscow to stay their elderly parents at home.

Design 
Babushkinskaya is a single vault-type station, elliptical in cross-section with slightly canted, grey marble side walls. All of the signs and light fixtures are attached to the ceiling, so the platform is completely open except for a few minimalist benches located along the central axis. At the end of the platform, above the exit stairs, is a sculpture by A. M. Mosichuk commemorating Babushkin's Arctic flight.

Entrances 
The entrances to the station are located at the intersection of Yeniseyskaya and Menzhinskogo Streets.

References

Moscow Metro stations
Railway stations in Russia opened in 1978
Kaluzhsko-Rizhskaya Line
Railway stations located underground in Russia